Sir William Moore, 2nd Baronet (1663 – 28 August 1693) was an Anglo-Irish politician. 

Moore was the son of Sir Emanuel Moore, 1st Baronet and Martha Hull, and in 1692 he succeeded to his father's baronetcy. He was the Member of Parliament for Bandonbridge in the Irish House of Commons between 1692 and his death in 1693.

Moore married Catherine Percival on 19 October 1683; they had two sons. He was succeeded in his title by his eldest son, Emanuel Moore.

References

1663 births
1693 deaths
17th-century Anglo-Irish people
Baronets in the Baronetage of Ireland
Irish MPs 1692–1693
Members of the Parliament of Ireland (pre-1801) for County Cork constituencies